WindSim is wind energy software that uses CFD to optimize wind turbine placement in onshore and offshore wind farms.
WindSim is used worldwide by wind resource assessment professionals to help design more profitable wind farms.

History
WindSim was first developed by Vector AS, a consulting firm, as an internal tool used to build the Norwegian Wind Atlas  in cooperation with Norwegian Meteorological Institute .
WindSim was productized for PC platforms in 2003.
The software developer and the software product are both named "WindSim".

See also
Wind energy software
Wind resource assessment
Wind power

References

External links 
WindSim company website 
Norwegian Wind Atlas 

Wind power
Earth sciences software